Knives Out is a 2019 film by Rian Johnson.

Knives Out may also refer to:

 "Knives Out" (song), a 2001 song by Radiohead
 Knives Out, a 2017 battle royale video game by NetEase
 Knives Out!, an American metal band

See also
 Glass Onion: A Knives Out Mystery, 2022 sequel to the 2019 film